Francavilla in Sinni is a town and comune in the province of Potenza, Basilicata, in southern Italy.

History
The town was   founded in 1426. It had a charterhouse, destroyed in early 19th century by the Grande Armée of Napoleon, when it was occupied by the troops of  Joachim Murat.

Geography
The municipality borders with Chiaromonte, Fardella, San Severino Lucano, Terranova di Pollino and San Costantino Albanese. The river Sinni crosses its territory to the north.

Sport
The local football club is the F.C. Francavilla, that has its home ground in Nunzio Fittipaldi Stadium.

Transport
Francavilla is served by the SS 653 highway, that links the A2 motorway (at the exit "Lauria Nord", 35 km west) to the Ionian Coast (51 km east), nearby Policoro.

See also
Brigandage in southern Italy after 1861

References

External links

Official website  
 Francavilla in Sinni on comuni-italiani.it 

Cities and towns in Basilicata